East Coast Wrestling Association (ECWA) is an American professional wrestling promotion, founded by promoter Jim Kettner. It is home to the annual Super 8 Tournament, one of the longest-running independent wrestling tournaments in the country, as well as the annual Super 8 ChickFight Tournament. In 2010, Kettner announced his retirement and turned the promotion over to Mike Tartaglia and Joe Zanolle. Mike Tartaglia officially put the company on hiatus on June 5, 2019. In December 2019, Tartaglia sold the promotion to Zanolle.

Championships

Personnel

ECWA Hall of Fame
Established in 1982, the East Coast Wrestling Association (ECWA) Hall of Fame honors performers and staff members alike for their contributions to the organization. Though there is no physical location for the Hall of Fame, the organization acknowledges all inductees on its website.

Inductees

See also
List of independent wrestling promotions in the United States

Notes

References

External links
Official ECWA website

 
Sports in Delaware
Independent professional wrestling promotions based on the East Coast of the United States